Héctor Pérez Plazola (2 July 1933 – 10 June 2015) was a Mexican politician affiliated with the PAN. He served as Senator of the LX and LXI Legislatures of the Mexican Congress representing Jalisco and as Deputy between 1985–1988 and 1991–1994, as well as a local deputy in the Congress of Jalisco.

References

1933 births
2015 deaths
Politicians from Guadalajara, Jalisco
Members of the Senate of the Republic (Mexico)
Members of the Chamber of Deputies (Mexico)
National Action Party (Mexico) politicians
20th-century Mexican politicians
21st-century Mexican politicians
Municipal presidents of Guadalajara, Jalisco
University of Guadalajara alumni
Members of the Congress of Jalisco